Tomas Locatelli (born 9 June 1976) is an Italian former footballer who usually played as a playmaking attacking midfielder behind the forwards; he was also capable of playing as a central midfielder.

Club career 
Locatelli played over 200 matches in Serie A. After being a member of the club's youth side, he started his professional career at native club Atalanta in 1993 and made his Serie A debut against Udinese, on 2 April 1994. He moved to A.C. Milan in 1995, spending two seasons with the club making 10 league appearances, also winning the 1995–96 Serie A title. During his time with the club, he made his European debut in the 1996–97 UEFA Champions League, also scoring a goal in a 4–2 home win over Göteborg on 30 October 1996. In 1997, he moved to Udinese, and in 2000 he moved to Bologna, where he remained for five seasons. He signed with A.C. Siena after Bologna were relegated to Serie B in 2005.

During the 2008–09 and 2009–10 seasons, he played for Serie B club Mantova. In the 2010–11 season, he played for Spal in Lega Pro Prima Divisione. Since 31 March 2012 he has played for Arezzo in Serie D.

He was banned 2 years for involvement in 2011–12 Italian football scandal on 18 June 2012.

International career 
Locatelli has made 10 appearances for the Italy national under-21 football team, scoring one goal. He has also made 2 appearances for the senior Italy national football team, making his national team debut on 13 November 1999, in a 3–1 friendly home defeat to Belgium, in Lecce.

Trivia 
Due to having several commonalities with Manuel Locatelli, such as birthplace and the experience of playing for both Atalanta and A.C. Milan, he was mistakenly thought to be the player's father by a number of pundits. However, he has later stated that there are no family ties between him and Manuel.

Honours

Club 
Milan
Serie A: 1995–96

External links 
AIC Profile 
FIGC Profile

References 

Italian footballers
Italy youth international footballers
Italy under-21 international footballers
Italy international footballers
Atalanta B.C. players
A.C. Milan players
Udinese Calcio players
Bologna F.C. 1909 players
A.C.N. Siena 1904 players
Mantova 1911 players
S.S. Arezzo players
Serie A players
Serie B players
Serie C players
Serie D players
Association football midfielders
Footballers from Bergamo
1976 births
Living people